The 1928 Arizona Wildcats football team represented the University of Arizona as an independent during the 1928 college football season. In their 14th season under head coach Pop McKale, the Wildcats compiled a 5–1–2 record and outscored their opponents, 152 to 110. The team captain was Theodore R. P. "Ted" Diebold. The team's sole loss was to USC by a 78–7 score. The 78 points allowed against USC remains an Arizona program record, as does the 12 touchdowns allowed and the 38 points allowed in the fourth quarter against USC.

Schedule

References

Arizona
Arizona Wildcats football seasons
Arizona Wildcats football